Laurence Olivier (1907–1989) was an English actor who, along with his contemporaries Ralph Richardson and John Gielgud, dominated the British stage of the mid-20th century. He also worked in films throughout his career, playing more than fifty cinema roles. From 1956 he performed in television roles, for which he won several awards.

In 1939 Olivier appeared in the film Wuthering Heights in a role that saw him nominated for the Academy Award for Best Actor. The following year he was again nominated for the same award for his portrayal of Maxim de Winter in Rebecca. In 1944 he produced, directed and appeared as Henry V of England in Henry V. The film was nominated for several Academy Awards, including Best Picture and Best Actor, although it failed to win in any competitive category; instead Olivier received a "Special Award" for his work on the film. His next film, Hamlet (1948), became the first non-American film to win the Academy Award for Best Picture, and he also received the award for Best Actor. In 1979 Olivier was presented with an Academy Honorary Award to recognise his lifetime of contribution to the art of film. In total he was nominated for nine other acting Academy Awards and one each for production and direction. For his stage work Olivier won three Evening Standard Theatre Awards and was nominated for a Tony Award. He made his television debut in 1956, and was subsequently nominated nine times for an Emmy Award, winning on five occasions; he was also nominated for two British Academy Television Awards for his work in the medium.

In 1947 Olivier was appointed a Knight Bachelor, and in 1970 he was given a life peerage; the Order of Merit was conferred on him in 1981. He also received honours from foreign governments. In 1949 he was made Commander of the Order of the Dannebrog by the Danish government; the French appointed him Officier, Legion of Honour, in 1953; the Italian government created him Grande Ufficiale, Order of Merit of the Italian Republic, in 1953; and in 1971 he was granted the Order of Yugoslav Flag with Golden Wreath.

From academic and other institutions, Olivier received honorary doctorates from the university of Tufts, Massachusetts (1946), Oxford (1957) and Edinburgh (1964). He was also awarded the Danish Sonning Prize for outstanding contributions to European culture in 1966, the Gold Medallion of the Royal Swedish Academy of Letters, History and Antiquities in 1968; and the Albert Medal of the Royal Society of Arts in 1976. In February 1960 for his contribution to the film industry, Olivier was inducted into the Hollywood Walk of Fame, with a star at 6319 Hollywood Boulevard; he is also included in the American Theater Hall of Fame. In 1977 Olivier was awarded a British Film Institute Fellowship.

In addition to the naming of the National Theatre's largest auditorium in his honour, Olivier is commemorated in the Laurence Olivier Awards, bestowed annually since 1984 by the Society of London Theatre. In 1991 Olivier's friend, the actor John Gielgud, unveiled a memorial stone commemorating Olivier in Poets' Corner at Westminster Abbey. In 2007, the centenary of Olivier's birth, a life-sized statue of him was unveiled on the South Bank, outside the National Theatre; the same year the British Film Institute held a retrospective season of his film work.

Film

Stage

Television

State and academic honours

Notes and references

Notes

References

Sources

  

 

 

Laurence Olivier
Olivier, Laurence